Patrizia Susanne Menge (born 11 February 1960) is a German teacher and politician of Alliance 90/The Greens who has been serving as a member of the Bundestag since the 2021 elections.

Political career
From 2013 to 2017 and again from 2019 to 2021, Menge served as a member of the State Parliament of Lower Saxony. 

Menge became a member of the Bundestag in the 2021 elections, representing the Oldenburg – Ammerland district. In parliament, she has since been serving on the Committee on Transport and the Committee on Economic Cooperation and Development.

In addition to her committee assignments, Menge is part of the German-Egyptian Parliamentary Friendship Group.

Other activities
 German Foundation for World Population (DSW), Member of the Parliamentary Advisory Board (since 2022)

References

External links 
 

Living people
1960 births
People from Ammerland
21st-century German politicians
21st-century German women politicians
Members of the Bundestag for Alliance 90/The Greens
Members of the Bundestag 2021–2025
Female members of the Bundestag